Richard Fabian Stang (born 19 August 1955) is a Norwegian lawyer and a Norwegian politician for the Conservative Party.  He was Mayor of the city of Oslo from 2007 until 2015.

Early life and education
Stang was born in Oslo. He is the son of Norwegian actress Wenche Foss and entrepreneur Thomas Stang.

Career
Stang was first elected Mayor of Oslo in 2007, and reelected in 2011.

In 2012 Stang spoke out in favour of increased immigration.

Stang is a supporter of subsidies and perks for electric cars in the city.

In 2015 Stang lost the mayoral election to Socialist Marianne Borgen.

References

External links
 The family tree of Fabian Stang on Geni.com

1955 births
Living people
Mayors of Oslo
Conservative Party (Norway) politicians
Lawyers from Oslo
Fabian